The Schuyler City Hall is a historic two-story building with a three-story clock tower in Schuyler, Nebraska. It was built as a city hall in 1908, and designed in the Medieval Italian stye by German-born architect Joseph P. Guth. The Seth Thomas Clock Company clock was added in 1909. The building has been listed on the National Register of Historic Places since September 3, 1981.

References

National Register of Historic Places in Colfax County, Nebraska
Government buildings completed in 1908
1908 establishments in Nebraska
Medieval Italian architecture
City and town halls on the National Register of Historic Places in Nebraska